Defence Exhibition Organisation is an autonomous organisation of the Indian Government established in 1981. The organisation was established to promote export potential of the Indian defence industry. The agency is responsible for organising international exhibitions such as DEFEXPO and Indian participation at overseas exhibitions.  

DefExpo2020 was held in Lucknow, Uttar Pradesh from February 5th to 8th, 2020. This is for the first time the defence exhibition is being held in the northern state to explore potential available for defence productions. MoD has already announced Uttar Pradesh Defence Corridor to attract investments in defence manufacturing.

DefExpo2022 will be held in Gandhinagar, Gujarat from October 18 to October 22, 2020.The theme for this year's expo is ‘Path to Pride’, which is aimed at invoking nationalistic pride and encouraging citizens to partake in nation building through establishing a capable indigenous defence industry. DefExpo 2022

See also
 Aero India
Make In India
Startup India
defexpo.gov.in

References

External links
DefExpo Website

1981 establishments in Delhi
Defence agencies of India
Government agencies established in 1981